New America is a short story collection by Poul Anderson published in 1982.

Plot summary
New America is a short story collection, including "The Queen of Air and Darkness".

Reception
Michael J. Lowrey reviewed New America in Ares Magazine Special Edition #2 and commented that "Taken in toto, this is a very good collection which deserves repackaging in a more straightforward manner."

Reviews
Review by Mary Ann McIntyre Nixon (1983) in Fantasy Newsletter, #57 March 1983

References

1982 short story collections
Science fiction short story collections
Short story collections by Poul Anderson
Tor Books books